Colwell Bay is a bay in the west of the Isle of Wight. It is located between the towns of Totland and Yarmouth. The bay's northernmost point is Cliff's End (Fort Albert) the closest point of the Island to the British mainland, with Hurst Castle lying at the end of a long peninsula just 1500 metres (a little less than a mile) to the northwest. The southernmost point is Warden Point.

Colwell Bay has a popular beach, with two miles of sand and shingle, and facilities including cafes, shops and equipment hire outlets.

An area of 13.56 hectares has been notified as a geological Site of Special Scientific Interest, notification originally taking place in 1959. The site is significant for its Eocene geology and maritime vegetated soft cliff habitat.

It is the location of three chines: Colwell Chine, Brambles Chine and Linstone Chine.

Colwell Bay is on the A3054 road and near the western end of the A3055 road.  Public transport to the area is provided by Southern Vectis route 7 and the Needles Tour.

References

External links
Colwell Bay, official IoW tourism website
IOW Council information

Sites of Special Scientific Interest on the Isle of Wight
Bays of the Isle of Wight
Beaches of the Isle of Wight
Chines of the Isle of Wight